Vertigo substriata is a species of minute air-breathing land snail, a terrestrial pulmonate gastropod mollusk or micromollusk in the family Vertiginidae, the whorl snails.

Distribution 
The type locality is the Barnstaple district, of Devonshire, England. "Under stones, among dead and decaying leaves and at the roots of grass in woods and moist places."

This species occurs in countries and islands including:
 Czech Republic
 Netherlands
 Poland
 Slovakia
 Ukraine
 Great Britain
 Ireland
 Latvia
 and others

Shell description 

The shell is oval or subfusiform, rather thin, and semitransparent, glossy, pale yellowish-horn-color, very strongly and obliquely striate and almost ribbed in the line of growth, but less so on the body whorl, which is faintly striate spirally, periphery is rounded. The epidermis is rather thick. The shell has 4 whorls, which are very convex or cylindrical, and suddenly increasing in bulk. The penultimate whorl is slightly exceeding in breadth the last, which occupies about one-half of the shell. Spire is short, very abrupt and bluntly pointed. Suture is remarkably deep.

Aperture is semioval, contracted or sinuous in the middle of the outer edge; teeth from four to six, viz. from one to three (usually two) on the pillar (on parietal wall), one on the pillar lip, and two or three on the inside of the outer lip, the last springing from a white rib; in half grown specimens the pillar lip has a spiral or longitudinal fold. Outer lip thin and slightly reflected, externally strengthened by a strong rib, which is placed very near the opening the mouth; outer edge abruptly inflected, inner lip thickened in the adult. Umbilicus is small and narrow, contracted by a keel or ridge at the base of the shell.

The width of the adult shell is about 0.04 inch, the height is 0.065 inch.

References 
This article incorporates public domain text from reference.

 Bank, R. A.; Neubert, E. (2017). Checklist of the land and freshwater Gastropoda of Europe. Last update: July 16th, 2017
 Sysoev, A. V. & Schileyko, A. A. (2009). Land snails and slugs of Russia and adjacent countries. Sofia/Moskva (Pensoft). 312 pp., 142 plates.

External links 
Vertigo substriata at Animalbase taxonomy, short description, distribution, biology, status (threats), images
 effreys, J. G. (1833). A supplement to the synopsis of the testaceous pneumonobranchous Mollusca of Great Britain. Transactions of the Linnean Society of London. 16: 505-52
 Reeve, L. A. (1863). The land and freshwater mollusks indigenous to, or naturalised in, the British isles. Reeve, London
Boettger, O. (1880). Kaukasische Mollusken gesammelt von Herrn Hans Leder, z. Z. in Tiflis. Jahrbücher der Deutschen Malakozoologischen Gesellschaft. 7 (2): 109-150, pl. 4. Frankfurt am Main
 Schileyko, A. A. & Rymzhanov, T. S. (2013). Fauna of land mollusks (Gastropoda, Pulmonata Terrestria) of Kazakhstan and adjacent territories. Moscow-Almaty: KMK Scientific Press. 389 pp

substriata
Fauna of the British Isles
Gastropods described in 1833
Taxa named by John Gwyn Jeffreys
Taxobox binomials not recognized by IUCN